Sri Lakshmi Narasimha Swamy Temple or simply known as Yadadri or Yadagirigutta temple, (also known as Pancha Narasimha Kshetram and Rishi Aradhana Kshetram) is a Hindu temple situated on a hillock in the small town of Yadagirigutta in the Yadadri Bhuvanagiri district of the Indian state of Telangana. The temple is an abode of Narasimha, an incarnation of Lord Vishnu.

In 2016 a large expansion and rebuilding of the temple began and completed by March 2022.

Temple legend
According to Skanda Purana, Yada Maharishi, son of venerated Maharshi Rishyasringa performed penance here to Lord Vishnu as Narasimha. Being pleased with his penance lord appeared before him and manifested himself in five forms: Jwaalaa Narasimha, Gandabheranda Narasimha, Yogananda Narasimha, Ugra Narasimha and Lakshmi Narasimha . Yada Maharishi begged Narasimha to remain on the hill in these forms. For this reason, the Lakshmi-Narasimhadeva temple on the hilltop has deities of Narasimha in all five forms embedded in stone in the main cave. Historically, the temple has followed the Thenkalai tradition of the Vaishnava Agama Shastras as followed in South India.

Deities in the temple
The temple is in a cave about 12 feet high by 30 feet long, located in back of the temple hall, by the rear pillar. You take a stairway down into the chamber and then toward the back. Jwala Narasimha is in the shape of serpent, while Yogananda Narasimha appears sitting in meditation in yoga pose. You will also see silver deities of Lakshmi-Narasimha, which are quite striking in appearance and lends presence of seeing them. To the right of the temple main door is a Hanuman temple. You'll see a long horizontal gap in the rock just below Hanuman. This is said to be where Gandabheranda Narasimha manifested. This is a very popular temple. It is said that any wish of a sincere devotee visiting this temple will be fulfilled. The sanctum sanctorum or Garbhagriha is located in a cave, under a huge slating rock, which covers half the abode.

New Yadadri Temple
A new temple is being built at the old temple site. For use until the new temple is completed, a temporary temple, Balalayam, was built. The entire Yadadri temple renovated with the Krishna Sila (Black stone) is going to become known for its uniqueness. The new temple has been inaugurated on 28 March 2022 by Chief Minister of Telangana  K. Chandrasekhar Rao.

Donations and renovations
The Chief Minister of Telangana, K. Chandrashekhar Rao initiated the renovation of the temple, and approved a final layout  Major renovation of the temple is being taken up with a budget of ₹1800 crores. The work started in 2016 and is being executed  and completed in March 2022 by Yadadri Temple Development Authority (YTDA). The temple owned 39 kilos of gold and 1,753 tonnes of silver for lining the gopurams and walls in the temple. The centuries-old practice of using lime mortar to join different stone parts is being used. The YTDA acquired around 1900 acres by spending ₹300 crores. He also constructed houses near vishnu gundam (a place for taking bath).

The Seventh Nizam of Hyderabad, Mir Osman Ali Khan during his time had passed a grant of Rs.82,825 to this temple.

In Feb 2023, Princess Esra wife of 8th Nizam gifted jewellery worth 8 Lakh Rupees to the temple.

Sections
The sections of the temple include the main temple, Mukha Mandapam, seven gopurams (domes) with wooden roofs, vratha peetham, Swamy Vari Udyana Vanam, kalyana mandapam, satram etc. The pillars of 12 Alvars (those immersed in God) in the main temple is a significant feature.

The temple entrance arch will depict Mahābhūta (the five elements).
there is vishnu gundam.

Temple architecture

The architecture of the temple is based on Agama Shashtra. The temple is built entirely in stone. The temple was earlier built on 2 acres. After demolishing all structures on the temple hillock, the base for the temple is now 14 acres.

Design
The principal film set designer is Anand Sai and lead architect P Madhusudhan, chosen for their understanding of the ancient designs based on silpa and Agama principles. The entire temple is built in stone. The stone designs in Yadadri were provided by the chief sthapathi of the temple, Sundararajan Srinivasan.

Sculptures
Three types of stones are being used for the temple like Krishna Sila (also known as Purusha Sila) for presiding deities in the sanctum sanctorum; Sthri Sila for deities of Goddesses; and Napunsaka Sila used for flooring, walls etc. Black granite stone is also used, based on the temple architecture of the Kakatiya Dynasty in Telangana. The black granite stone has tiny pores, and it becomes strong and hard when milk, curd, oil and other liquids get into those pores, according to learned  (sculpture experts).

Transport
Yadagirigutta is well connected by both rail and road. It is about 55 km from Uppal, a major suburb of Hyderabad and 65 km from Mahatma Gandhi Bus Station at Hyderabad. A new bus stand is built on a 15 acres, as a part of new temple development. The proposed Hyderabad Regional Ring Road passes through Yadagirigutta.

The nearest railway stations are Raigiri about 5 km away and Bhuvanagiri, a major town of Hyderabad Metropolitan Region about 13 km away. Raigir railway station has been renamed as Yadadri(YADD) by South Central Railway in line with the new nomenclature of the temple town. The Hyderabad MMTS - Phase II is planned, to be extended from Ghatkesar to Raigir station, which is 5 km from Yadagirigutta. A metro train is proposed between Uppal and Yadagirigutta.

See also
 Tirumala Venkateswara Temple
 Sri Raja Rajeshwara Temple, Vemulawada

References

External links
 www.yadagirigutta.org - Official site
 Yadagirigutta Temple Timings

Hindu temples in Nalgonda district
Hindu temples in Telangana
Tourist attractions in Nalgonda district
Narasimha temples